General Humberto Ortega Saavedra (born January 10, 1947  in Managua) is a Nicaraguan military leader, Latin American revolutionary strategist, and published writer.  He was Minister of Defense between the victory of the Sandinista revolution in 1979 under the National Reconstruction Government, through the first presidency of his brother Daniel Ortega, and through the presidency of Violeta Barrios de Chamorro who defeated Daniel Ortega in the elections of 1990.

Biography
Humberto Ortega, his brother, the current President of Nicaragua, Daniel Ortega, and Victor Tirado López founded the Tercerista tendency of the Sandinista National Liberation Front (FSLN) in 1975. He, among others leaders, crafted the urban insurrection strategy that ignited civil war in Nicaragua in October 1977 which led to the fall of the Somoza dynastic dictatorship in July 1979.  As Minister of Defense during the decade of Sandinista rule, Ortega oversaw the buildup of the Sandinista Popular Army (EPS) and the prosecution of the war against the "contra" resistance factions and their peasant support base.

Following the electoral defeat of Daniel Ortega and the Sandinista Party in 1990, Humberto maintained control of the military. Later that year accusations arose against Humberto claiming his involvement in the murder and cover-up of sixteen-year-old Jean Paul. Ortega's bodyguards allegedly shot and killed the young man when he attempted to pass the general's motorcade on October 28, 1990. In November 1990 the Nicaraguan National Assembly along with experts from the Venezuelan Ministry of Justice began an investigation of this incident. Most of the evidence found by the investigators proved to be circumstantial and the travel records for the motorcade were never found. Civil District Judge Boanerges Ojeda suggested Ortega's bodyguards, two officers, and Humberto be tried in court before he passed the case to the military prosecutors office where it was closed in July 1992. He retired  in 1995, turning the job over to his second in command, Joaquín Cuadra. General Humberto Ortega started transforming the EPS into the non-political Nicaraguan National Army.

Response on arrests of pre-election candidates 
He spoke out on the arbitrary arrests of his brother's regime, and encouraged his government to release the accused, claiming that they are not terrorists, but opponents with different points of view. In December 2019, Humberto asked his brother Daniel to release the at least 168 opponents who, at that time, were detained for demonstrating against the government. In response, Daniel Ortega indirectly accused his brother of being a "homeland sell-out" and of "defending terrorists," without, however, mentioning his name.

Published writer
In December 2004 he released a book titled La epopeya de la insurrección (Epic of the Insurrection). Ortega says he worked 10 hours a day on the book for two years using his own records, meeting notes, archives and analytical schemes to reconstruct the history of the struggle that ultimately brought down the 43-year Somoza family dictatorship. Among his other books are, 50 años de lucha sandinista, Sobre la insurrección and Nicaragua revolución y democracia.

Works
A diez años de la rendición total de la guardia somocista (1989).
Sobre la insurrección (1981).
50 años de lucha sandinista (1978).
La epopeya de la insurrección (2004).
Nicaragua (1992).
Sobre la insurrección (1981).
Insurrección y Nicaragua Revolución
Democracia de sobre.

References

External links
 Website for the book. 'La Epopeya de la Insurrección

1947 births
Living people
People from Managua
Nicaraguan people of Spanish descent
Sandinista National Liberation Front politicians
Defense ministers of Nicaragua
Nicaraguan military personnel
Nicaraguan male writers
People of the Nicaraguan Revolution